David Lyle Bahnsen (born May 30, 1974) is an American portfolio manager, author, and television commentator.

Early life and education 

Bahnsen was born in Torrance, California, and is the son of Greg L. Bahnsen, an American  theologian and apologist. He grew up in Irvine, California.

Career 

Bahnsen is the Managing Partner and Chief Investment Officer of The Bahnsen Group, a wealth management firm based in Newport Beach, California. He was previously a Chairman's Club Managing Director at Morgan Stanley.

Bahnsen has been named as one of Forbes Top 250 Advisors, Financial Times''' Top 300 Advisors in America, and Barron's America's Top 1200 Advisors.

He sits on the boards of the National Review Institute, Pacifica Christian High School, and The King's College. Bahnsen is also a faculty member of the Acton Institute.

 Political work 

Bahnsen is a contributor for Forbes, and National Review, where he writes on the intersection of markets and politics. He is a frequent guest on CNBC, Fox Business, Bloomberg TV, Fox News, and other networks. Bahnsen is the co-host of National Review's Radio Free California podcast.

In August 2017, Bahnsen sent a letter to President Donald J. Trump asking him to pardon Michael Milken.

Bahnsen released his first book, Crisis of Responsibility: Our Cultural Addiction to Blame and How You Can Cure It, on February 13, 2018. His second book, The Case for Dividend Growth: Investing in a Post-Crisis World, was released on April 9, 2019. His book, Elizabeth Warren: How Her Presidency Would Destroy The Middle Class and the American Dream, was published on January 28, 2020.  There's No Free Lunch, published by Post Hill Press, was released in 2021, and his latest book Mis-Inflation: The Truth About Inflation, Pricing, and the Creation of Wealth'', co-authored with Douglas Wilson and published by Canon Press, came out in 2022.

References 

Living people
1974 births
American male non-fiction writers
Chief investment officers
American money managers